Andrzej Gronowicz (born March 7, 1951 in Piła) is a Polish sprint canoer who competed in the 1970s. Competing in two Summer Olympics, he won a silver medal in the C-2 500 m event at Montreal in 1976.

Gronowicz also won three medals at the ICF Canoe Sprint World Championships with a silver (C-2 1000 m: 1974) and two bronzes (C-2 500 m: 1973, C-2 1000 m: 1977).

Gronowicz became the head coach of the Saskatoon Racing Canoe Club of Saskatoon, Saskatchewan, in 1988.  He is a certified Level 3 coach under the NCCP (National Coaching Certification Program) and is pursuing Level 4 certification.  His athletes have gone on to compete internationally at the Summer Olympics and the ICF Canoe Sprint World Championships.

References

 Sports-reference.com profile

1951 births
Canoeists at the 1972 Summer Olympics
Canoeists at the 1976 Summer Olympics
Living people
Polish male canoeists
Olympic canoeists of Poland
Olympic silver medalists for Poland
Olympic medalists in canoeing
People from Piła
ICF Canoe Sprint World Championships medalists in Canadian
Sportspeople from Greater Poland Voivodeship
Medalists at the 1976 Summer Olympics